Gonatus is a genus of squid in the family Gonatidae, comprising twelve species, and therefore containing the most species in the family. Adult squid belonging to species in this genus are notable for their lack of tentacles.

The genus contains bioluminescent species.

Species

References

Squid
Bioluminescent molluscs
Taxa named by John Edward Gray